Ladki Pasand Hai is a 1971 Bollywood drama film directed by C.L. Rawal. The film stars Mumtaz.

Cast
Mumtaz
Jeevan   
Deepak Kumar (actor)   
Manmohan   
Manorama   
Mehmood Jr.   
Rajendra Nath   
Randhir   
Sajjan   
Sindhu   
Sulochana   
Tabassum

Songs
"Tu Kar De Nazar Se Mastana Main Cheez Hai Kya" - Hemlata, Mukesh
"Maan Bhi Jao Sanam Ruth Ke Jaya Na Karo" - Mohammed Rafi
"Vafaa Ke Naam Par Mitanaa, Agar Tu Aabaru Apani" - Mukesh
"Zulfon Me Chupana Kya, Main Apne DilMein" - Hemlata, Mohammed Rafi
"Jawani Phir Na Aayegi mahobbat phir" - Hemlata
"Pappa Humse Pyar Karo" - Hemlata, Sulakshana Pandit, Usha Timothy
"Ho Bhala Pyar Ka Ek Ho Gaye Begane Do" - Mahendra Kapoor, Mumtaz
"Kaha Le Kar Jaye Ye Tuta Hua Dil" - Lata Mangeshkar

External links
 

1971 films
1970s Hindi-language films
1971 drama films
Films scored by Sonik-Omi